Gammelshausen is a town in the district of Göppingen in Baden-Württemberg, Germany.

History
Gammelshausen returned to Württemberg in 1806, when it was mediatized to the Kingdom of Württemberg and assigned to the district of Göppingen. After World War II, Gammelshausen began a period of urban growth that has since the turn of the millennium two areas to the town's southeast established in the 1970s. A redevelopment of the town center began in 2009 and was scheduled to conclude in 2017.

Geography
The municipality (Gemeinde) of Gammelshausen is located in the district of Göppingen, in Baden-Württemberg, one of the 16 States of the Federal Republic of Germany. Elevation above sea level in the municipal area ranges from a high of  Normalnull (NN) to a low of  NNl.

Politics
Gammelshausen has one borough (Ortsteil): Gammelshausen. The municipality is in a municipal association with Bad Boll.

Coat of arms
Gammelshausen's coat of arms shows a red house with one door and three windows below two cherries upon a field of yellow. The house represents Gammelshausen itself, and the cherries its history of local cherry cultivation. This coat of arms was awarded by the Federal Ministry of the Interior on 9 October 1959, along with a corresponding municipal flag.

Transportation
Gammelshausen is connected to Germany's network of roadways by the Bundesautobahn 8, which join the municipality's local Landesstraßen und Kreisstraßen at a junction  outside of its municipal area.

References

External links

  (in German)

Towns in Baden-Württemberg
Göppingen (district)